The independence of New Zealand is a matter of continued academic and social debate. New Zealand has no fixed date of independence from the United Kingdom; instead, political independence came about as a result of New Zealand's evolving constitutional status. The concept of a national "Independence Day" does not exist in New Zealand.

Beginning in the late 1700s New Zealand's existing Māori population was supplemented by sealers and whalers, followed by sporadic arrivals of adventurers from Europe and the Americas, Christian missionaries, and escaped convicts from Australia. During this time New Zealand was under no formal rule and was ignored by the British who were otherwise involved in developing neighbouring Australia as a British colony. French interests in New Zealand prompted the British to draw their attention to New Zealand and make efforts in establishing British rule, firstly by "declaring" New Zealand as part of the Colony of New South Wales. The inclination of the Colonial Office in London to adopt the subterfuge of regarding New Zealand as “a Foreign Power under a regular Government” was demonstrated by the appointment of James Busby from Australia as the official British Resident to New Zealand. Busby arrived in New Zealand in May 1833.

In 1835, a number of Māori chiefs asserted their sovereignty within their independent tribal nations by signing the Declaration of the Independence of New Zealand (He Whakaputanga o te Rangatiratanga o Nu Tireni). On 6 February 1840, William Hobson, as representative of the United Kingdom, and Māori chiefs signed the Treaty of Waitangi, which established the right of the British Crown to govern, and Hobson subsequently proclaimed British sovereignty over the islands in May of the same year. On 17 August 1840 the first French colonists arrived in Akaroa, soon learning of the new British rule, and thus effectively ending any further colonization attempts by France. The connection was severed formally when the last Commissaire du Roi (Representative of the King of France) departed New Zealand on 10 April 1846.

On 16 November 1840, the British government issued the Charter for Erecting the new Colony of New Zealand. The Charter stated that the Colony of New Zealand would be established as a Crown colony separate from New South Wales on 1 July 1841. In 1853, only 12 years after the founding of the colony, the British Parliament passed the New Zealand Constitution Act 1852 to grant the colony's settlers the right to self-governance. New Zealand was, therefore, to all intents and purposes independent in domestic matters from its earliest days as a British colony.

The first major step towards nationhood on the international stage came in 1919 when New Zealand was given a seat in the newly founded League of Nations. In 1926 the Balfour Declaration declared Britain's Dominions as "equal in status", followed by the creation of the legal basis of independence, established by the Statute of Westminster 1931 which came about mainly at the behest of nationalist elements in South Africa and the Irish Free State. However, Australia, New Zealand, and Newfoundland were hostile towards this development, and the statute was not adopted in New Zealand until 1947. Irrespective of any legal developments, some New Zealanders still perceived themselves as a distinctive outlying branch of the United Kingdom until at least the 1970s. This attitude began to change when the United Kingdom joined the European Community in 1973 and abrogated its preferential trade agreements with New Zealand, and gradual nationality and societal changes further eroded the relationship.

History

Declaration of Independence (1835)

On 28 October 1835, the Declaration of the Independence of New Zealand was signed by the United Tribes of New Zealand, a loose confederation of Māori tribes from the far north of New Zealand organised by British resident James Busby. This document declared the independence of the Māori tribes (iwi) who signed the Declaration, which was acknowledged by Lord Glenelg, Secretary of State for War and the Colonies on behalf of the British Crown on 25 May 1836, following consideration of the Declaration by the House of Lords. The Declaration and acknowledgement of New Zealand's independence continued after this acknowledgement, such as in Lord Normanby's instructions to Captain William Hobson, where Lord Normanby stated: "...we acknowledge New Zealand as a sovereign and independent State."

Colonisation: The Treaty of Waitangi

The signing of the Treaty of Waitangi on 6 February 1840 marked the beginning of the colonisation of New Zealand by Britain. At the same time, the New Zealand Company sought to acquire land from Māori in the lower North Island and upper South Island for its colonisation schemes. The company viewed itself as a prospective quasi-government of New Zealand and in 1845 and 1846 proposed splitting the colony in two, along a line from Mokau in the west to Cape Kidnappers in the east—with the north reserved for Māori and missionaries, while the south would become a self-governing province, known as "New Victoria" and managed by the company for that purpose. Britain's Colonial Secretary rejected the proposal. On 21 May 1840, in response to the creation of a "republic" by the New Zealand Company settlers of Port Nicholson (Wellington), who were laying out a new town under the flag of the United Tribes of New Zealand, Hobson asserted British sovereignty over the whole of New Zealand, despite the incompleteness of the treaty signing. New Zealand was originally a sub-colony of the Colony of New South Wales, but in 1841 the Colony of New Zealand was created. Waitangi Day is thus celebrated as New Zealand's national day. Some constitutional lawyers, such as Moana Jackson, have argued that the Treaty did not cede total sovereignty of New Zealand to the British Crown, and argue that the Treaty intended to protect tino rangatiratanga or the absolute independence of Māori. Others dispute this, pointing to the use of the term kāwanatanga (governorship) in the Treaty deducts from rangatiratanga, equating the term to Māori control of Māori assets.

The principles behind the independence of New Zealand began before New Zealand even became a British colony. There had been minor rebellions in Canada, and in order to avoid making the mistakes which had led to the American Revolution, Lord Durham was commissioned to make a report on the government of colonies which contained a substantial British population. The principles of self-government within the Empire were laid down in the Durham Report of 1839 and first put into operation in Nova Scotia in 1848. Canada, New Zealand, and the Australian colonies very soon followed suit. The first New Zealand Constitution Act granting self-government was passed by Britain's parliament in 1846 but suspended following the arrival of Governor George Grey, who cited the outbreak of the Flagstaff War (the beginning of the New Zealand Wars) and the unwieldy nature of the 1846 Act as reasons for suspending the Act. In response, the Wellington Settlers' Constitutional Association was formed to campaign for self-government. Some members of this group, such as newspaper publisher Samuel Revans, recounting earlier New Zealand Company schemes for a separate colony, advocated for independence outside of the British Empire.

As a result of this pressure, Governor Grey wrote his own draft constitution bill, while camping on Mount Ruapehu in 1851. The draft was largely accepted by the British parliament, and New Zealand finally became a self-governing colony in 1853 following the passage of the New Zealand Constitution Act 1852, which established an elected legislature, the New Zealand Parliament, in the colony. The New Zealand Parliament was bound by a number of Acts of the British Parliament, such as the Colonial Laws Validity Act and the Colonial Naval Defence Act 1865 which led to the creation of the Flag of New Zealand in 1869.

New Zealand participated in the 1891 National Australian Convention in Sydney to consider the Federation of the Australian and New Zealand colonies. The Convention agreed to four principles including the creation of a Federated army and navy. Interest in the proposed Australian Federation faded and New Zealand did not send a delegation to the 1897 National Australian Convention.

Dominion status

In 1901 New Zealand did not ratify the Australian Constitution, and did not partake in the Federation of Australia. Prime Minister Joseph Ward determined that New Zealand should become a dominion, and parliament passed a resolution to that effect. On 26 September 1907 the United Kingdom granted New Zealand (along with Newfoundland, which later became a part of Canada) "Dominion" status within the British Empire. New Zealand became known as the Dominion of New Zealand. The date was declared Dominion Day, but never reached any popularity as a day of independence. As a potential national day, Dominion Day never possessed any emotional appeal, although the term "Dominion" was popular. The Dominion newspaper began on Dominion Day, 1907. To regard it as a national independence day is incorrect, the change to dominion status was seen as "purely cosmetic."

Despite this new status, there was some apprehension in 1919 when Prime Minister Bill Massey signed the Treaty of Versailles, which indicated that New Zealand did have a degree of control over its foreign affairs. Massey, himself a fervent imperialist, did not view it as a symbolic act.

In 1926, the Balfour Declaration declared that the British Dominions were equal, which had the effect of granting New Zealand control over its own foreign policy and military. The legislation required to effect this change, the Statute of Westminster 1931 was not adopted by New Zealand until some 16 years later. By 1939, the governor-general ceased to be Britain's High Commissioner to New Zealand; instead, an independent officer was appointed.

League of Nations
New Zealand joined the League of Nations on 10 January 1920. Under International Law only a sovereign state can sign an international treaty – although New Zealand and the other Dominions signed as part of a "British Empire Delegation", and their names were indented in a list following that of Britain. The significance of the indentation was perhaps deliberately left unclear. The Treaty of Versailles offered membership to any "fully self-governing State, Dominion, or Colony" (Art. 1).

At the 1921 Imperial Conference British Prime Minister Lloyd George said:

1926 Imperial Conference

The Balfour Declaration (not to be confused with the Balfour Declaration of 1917 on Palestine) stated that "They [the Dominions] are autonomous Communities within the British Empire, equal in status, in no way subordinate one to another in any aspect of their domestic or external affairs, though united by a common allegiance to the Crown, and freely associated as members of the British Commonwealth of Nations." This was given legal effect by the Statute of Westminster 1931, which took effect when a given Dominion adopted it. The New Zealand Government saw little urgency in the Act and delayed ratification, but for practical purposes 1926 had removed doubts about functional independence. At the opening of the 1930 Imperial Conference which drafted the Statute of Westminster, the Prime Minister of New Zealand, George Forbes stated:

In 1914 Britain had declared war on the Central Powers for the whole British Empire but in 1939 the Dominions made their own decisions. On 3 September 1939 New Zealand declared war on Germany. Declaration of war is normally regarded as an indication of sovereignty.

Statute of Westminster and Realm (1930s–1970s)

At the outset of the Second World War, then Prime Minister Michael Joseph Savage, who had been critical of the British policy of appeasement, famously declared: 

Savage's successor, Peter Fraser, did not withdraw New Zealand troops from the Middle East in 1942 (unlike Australia), based on an assessment of New Zealand interests.

In the 1944 Speech from the Throne the Governor-General announced the Fraser Government's intention to adopt the Statute of Westminster. However, there was a strong outcry by the opposition that this would weaken the British Empire in a time of need. In 1946, Fraser instructed Government departments not to use the term "Dominion" any longer. Ironically, the failure of a private members bill to abolish the upper house by future Prime Minister Sidney Holland led to the adoption of the Statute of Westminster on 25 November 1947 with the Statute of Westminster Adoption Act 1947. This Act allowed passing of the New Zealand Constitution Amendment (Request and Consent) Act 1947, which granted the New Zealand Parliament full legislative powers, extra-territorial control of the New Zealand military forces and legally separated the New Zealand Crown from the British Crown. Thus, although the monarch of the United Kingdom remains also the monarch of New Zealand this person acts in a distinct capacity as sovereign of each.

In 1948, the New Zealand Parliament passed the British Nationality and New Zealand Citizenship Act 1948, altering the New Zealand nationality law. From 1 January 1949 all New Zealanders became New Zealand citizens. However, New Zealanders remained British subjects under New Zealand nationality law. Prior to this Act, migrants to New Zealand were classed as either "British" (mainly from the United Kingdom itself, but also other Commonwealth countries such as Australia, South Africa and India) or "Non-British".

At a meeting of Commonwealth prime ministers in 1952 following the death of King George VI, it was agreed that the new Queen Elizabeth could have a royal style and title that was different in each dominion, but with an element common to all the dominions. New Zealand was thus an independent Commonwealth realm. In 1953 the New Zealand Parliament passed the Royal Style and Titles Act 1953, which formally recognised Queen Elizabeth II as the Queen of the United Kingdom and New Zealand.

Until 1967, there was a requirement that nominations to the office of governor-general were approved by British ministers. The first New Zealand-born governor-general was appointed to the office, Lord Poritt (although Bernard Freyberg had previously been appointed in 1946; Freyberg had been born in the United Kingdom, but had lived in New Zealand from a young age). Porritt had also been resident in the United Kingdom for most of his life. Public opinion was divided on appointing a New Zealander to the role; a Gallup opinion poll for the Auckland Star newspaper found 43 per cent of respondents preferred Britons for the role, while 41 per cent favoured New Zealanders and 6 per cent candidates from other Commonwealth countries. Newspapers at the time welcomed the appointment, the Greymouth Star saying that it was "an acknowledgement of New Zealand's maturity." The result was a greater focus on new overseas markets for New Zealand goods, mainly in the Asia-Pacific regions.

Loosened ties with Britain (1970s–present) 
A major breakaway from British influence occurred in the mid 1960s as a result of the Vietnam War. Under the ANZUS Treaty and growing concerns about Communist influences in the Asia-Pacific region, the United States pressured the governments of Australia and New Zealand to contribute to the war in Vietnam, eventually resulting in both nations sending forces. New Zealand's involvement lasted from 1963 until 1975, consisting of both military and non-military aid. The Vietnam War was the first conflict that New Zealand entered that did not involve Britain or any other Commonwealth nations other than Australia. Although the war was largely unpopular in New Zealand, the conflict brought closer ties between New Zealand and the United States militarily, at least until 1986 when New Zealand was suspended from ANZUS due to its anti-nuclear policy. This led to the Reagan administration cutting major military and diplomatic ties between Wellington and Washington, downgrading New Zealand from 'ally', to 'friend'.

A more significant move towards independence in a practical rather than legal sense came in 1973 when Britain joined the European Economic Community. The move, although anticipated, caused major economic structural adjustment issues, as the vast majority of New Zealand's exports went to Britain at that time.

The election of the nationalist Third Labour Government of Norman Kirk in 1972 brought further changes. Kirk's Government introduced the Constitution Amendment Act 1973, which altered the New Zealand Constitution Act 1852 so that the New Zealand Parliament could legislate extra-territorially. In Re Ashman the Supreme Court (since renamed the High Court, not to be confused with the contemporary Supreme Court) held that as a result of the 1973 Act, New Zealand had formally severed the New Zealand Crown from the British Crown. The Third Labour Government also passed the Royal Titles Act 1974, changing the Queen's style and titles to be solely Queen of New Zealand. The nationality listed in New Zealand passports for the passport holder was changed in 1973 from "British Subject and New Zealand Citizen" to simply "New Zealand citizen".

In 1983 a new Letters Patent was issued, written by a New Zealander and signed by the then New Zealand Prime Minister. The new letters patent declared New Zealand as the "Realm of New Zealand", and repealed the previous Imperial Letters Patent of 1917. The final practical constitutional link to Britain of New Zealand's Parliament was removed in 1986 by the Constitution Act 1986 (effective 1 January 1987). This Act removed the residual power of the United Kingdom Parliament to legislate for New Zealand at its request and consent. The Imperial Laws Application Act 1988 clarified the application of British laws in New Zealand.

In 1996, New Zealand created its own royal honours system (including knighthoods and damehoods). The honours retained the Victoria Cross but ceased appointments to British imperial honours. With few exceptions, all honours and awards were conferred by the Queen of New Zealand on the advice of her New Zealand ministers. Certain awards remained in the exclusive gift of the Queen.

In 2003 the Fifth Labour Government, led by Helen Clark, abolished appeals to the Judicial Committee of the Privy Council and created the Supreme Court of New Zealand, a move further separating New Zealand from the United Kingdom, though there was provision for cases commenced before then to remain subject to the right of appeal.

At the same time, political relations between New Zealand and the United States improved during the George W. Bush administration (2001-2009) especially after Prime Minister Helen Clark visited the White House on 22 March 2007. They ended the difficult relationship that had escalated in 1986. New agreements between New Zealand and the United and States for defense cooperation were signed in 2010 ("Wellington Declaration"), 2012 ("Washington Declaration"), and a reaffirmation of the bilateral agreements in 2022 ("Aotearoa New Zealand Joint Statement.")

Independence in the New Zealand flag debate 

Although the current New Zealand flag remains a popular symbol of New Zealand, there are proposals from time to time for the New Zealand flag to be changed. Proponents of a new flag argued "[t]he current New Zealand Flag is too colonial and gives the impression that New Zealand is still a British colony and not an independent nation."

Two referendums were held on the flag in 2015 and 2016, with a 56.6% majority voting to keep the current flag.

Independence in the republic debate

The monarch—British in origin and by residence—still enjoys majority support as the symbolic head of state of New Zealand. Some New Zealanders see the monarchy of New Zealand as the final hurdle to full independence. In 1994 the National Party Prime Minister Jim Bolger initiated a debate on the possibility of New Zealand becoming a republic. Bolger argued that New Zealand needed to focus more on the Asia–Pacific region, and noted that such a move would be part of a desire to be "independent New Zealanders". Bolger later argued that he did not believe the "Queen of England" should be New Zealand's head of state. Bolger's republicanism met little public enthusiasm.

Unlike Australia, where republican sentiment has been relatively strong, there has been little agitation for a New Zealand republic. Neither National nor Labour, the two major political parties currently in parliament, have a stated policy of setting up a republic. Two special-interest groups represent different sides of the debate in New Zealand and argue the issue in the media from time to time: Monarchy New Zealand and New Zealand Republic.

See also

 Constitution of New Zealand
 History of New Zealand

References

Footnotes

Citations

Bibliography

External links
New Zealand sovereignty: 1857, 1907, 1947, or 1987? , Research Report, Parliamentary Library, 28 August 2007.

Politics of New Zealand
Republicanism in New Zealand